The Anaheim Bolts were an American professional indoor soccer team founded in 2009. Since March 2011, the team had been a member of the Professional Arena Soccer League. Citing poor attendance and increasing costs, the team suspended operations in June 2013 and will not participate in the 2013–14 PASL season while new owners are sought for the franchise.

History

Bernie Lilavois, an indoor soccer veteran and former coach of the California Cougars, founded the Los Angeles Bolts as a member of the Premier Arena Soccer League for the 2009-2010 season. On March 7, 2011, the team moved to the Professional Arena Soccer League as the Anaheim Bolts.

On May 28, 2013, Bernie Lilavois returned the franchise to the PASL in order to become President and Head Coach of the new Ontario Fury. The PASL announced that they are looking for new ownership for the Bolts and that they would not play in the 2013–14 season.

Year-by-year

References

 
2009 establishments in California
Association football clubs established in 2009
Defunct Professional Arena Soccer League teams
Defunct indoor soccer clubs in the United States
Indoor soccer clubs in the United States